Frankie Wainman Junior (born 6 October 1971) is a BriSCA Formula 1 Stock Cars racing driver, who races using the number 515. Wainman is a three-time BriSCA F1 World Champion, fourteen-time National Points Champion and nine-time British Champion along with many other titles.

Early life 

Wainman was brought up in the small town of Silsden, West Yorkshire. He is the son of former racer Frankie Wainman (racing number 212).

Racing career 
Wainman began racing at ten years old in Ministox and won a number of championships including the British Points Championship.

At sixteen he made the switch to BriSCA F1 using a car he had built himself. After three weeks he won his first final, in November 1987. He has won three World Championships and fourteen National Points Championships, as well as many other championships. Wainman also builds stock cars for other drivers. In the Netherlands, Wainman has won the Long Track World Championship at Baarlo and World Cup at Venray.

In the UK 'off season' between January and March, Wainman travels to New Zealand to take part in their equivalent formula, Superstocks. In 1998 he won the World 240 Championship, and won two more in later years. As of 2013 he is the only driver to have won this title three times. He has built and raced his own car which he kept over in New Zealand but this was sold in 2014.

In 2007 Frankie had an almost career ending accident at Hednesford Hills Raceway.

Wainman and rival driver Andy Smith were the subject of a BBC documentary Gears and Tears which aired in 2010, being the stock car version of War of the Roses with Wainman from Silsden and Smith being from Rochdale. During the 1980s both of their fathers (Frankie Wainman and Stuart Smith) were in close battles week in and week out, the same as Frankie Junior and Andy were in the late 2000s and early 2010s.

In 2012 Frankie amassed 250 final wins, becoming only the second driver ever to accomplish this feat, Stuart Smith being the other with 500 final wins.

Personal life 

Wainman has two children, Phoebe and Frankie, both of whom have taken up racing in BriSCA F1, while in V8 Hotstox Phoebe became the first female stock car driver to win a major championship.

Honours 

World Champion: 1998, 2005, 2016
National Points Champion: 1994, 1996, 1997, 1998, 1999, 2000, 2001, 2002, 2003, 2004, 2005, 2007, 2008, 2018
World Semi Final : 1995, 1998, 1999, 2000, 2001, 2002, 2004, 2005, 2007, 2009, 2010, 2012
British : 1992, 1999, 2001, 2003, 2004, 2005, 2006, 2016, 2017
European : 1995, 2006, 2014, 2022
National Series : 2002, 2003, 2004, 2005, 2007, 2008
Long Track / Gold Cup : 1998, 1999, 2006, 2015
240i NZ Championships : 1997, 2000, 2009
Grand National : 1995, 1997, 2000, 2001, 2002, 2003, 2004, 2005, 2011, 2014, 2018, 2021

UK Open : 2001, 2003, 2006, 2009
Trust Fund : 1991, 1998, 2002, 2004
BriSCA Supreme : 1991, 1993, 2010
Scottish : 2000, 2001, 2002, 2003, 2004, 2005
Grand Prix : 1998
Bumper Trophy : 1990, 2001, 2004, 2006
World of Shale : 1999, 2001, 2012

Memorial Wins 

Tony Abel : 1995
Richie Ahern : 1993, 2001, 2002, 2010
Bozzy Ashes : 2006
Allan Barker : 2006
Wilf Blundell : 1996, 1998, 2000, 2002, 2004, 2011, 2013
Steve Froggatt : 1999, 2001, 2003
Roger Merrick : 2004, 2006
Fred Mitchell : 1998, 2004, 2007, 2009, 2011
Mike Parker : 2007, 2009, 2011
Don Round : 2008
Harry Smith : 2006, 2007, 2008
Mark Wilkinson : 1997
Lee Wilson : 2007, 2009
Ernie Wright : 1993, 1995, 1998, 2005
Mo Jones : 2018

Notes

References

External links 
Wainman Racing website
Profile on F1stockcars.com
Profile on BriscaF1stox.co.uk

1971 births
Living people
English racing drivers
People from Silsden
Sportspeople from Yorkshire